A number of steamships have been named Arundel Castle, including:

, in service 1864–1983
, in service 1895–1905
RMS Arundel Castle, in service 1921–1958

Ship names